Armando Barrera Aira (born 18 November 1995) is a Cuban swimmer. In 2019, he represented Cuba at the 2019 World Aquatics Championships in Gwangju, South Korea.

In 2018, he won the silver medal in both the men's 100 metre backstroke and men's 200 metre backstroke events at the 2018 Central American and Caribbean Games held in Barranquilla, Colombia.

References

1995 births
Central American and Caribbean Games medalists in swimming
Central American and Caribbean Games silver medalists for Cuba
competitors at the 2018 Central American and Caribbean Games
Cuban male swimmers
living people
male backstroke swimmers
place of birth missing (living people)
20th-century Cuban people
21st-century Cuban people